Paulo César Lopes de Gusmão, better known as Paulo César Gusmão or PC Gusmão (born 19 May 1962, in Rio de Janeiro), is a former football goalkeeper and manager. Gusmão's playing career was from 1982 to 1999, and team manager from 2001 to 2018. Since then, he is a team technical coordinator.

Career
Paulo started his career playing for Vasco da Gama. Later he went on to play for other teams such as Botafogo, Campo Grande-RJ, Cabofriense-RJ, Americano-RJ, and Pouso Alegre-MG.

He has a college degree in physical education from the Universidade Castelo Branco and he graduated in 1984, his career, Paulo has trained keepers for Vasco (1992–1994); Fluminense (1995); Flamengo (1996); Santos; Corinthians. As an assistant manager he has coached Palmeiras and Cruzeiro. As a manager, he has coached Vasco (2001), Palmeiras (2002), Cruzeiro (2004 and 2005), Flamengo (2004), Cabofriense (2005), Botafogo (2005), Cruzeiro (2006) and São Caetano (2006). On 29 September 2006, he was announced as the new manager of Fluminense FC, in the Rio de Janeiro. In 2007, he was hired as Náutico's manager. He has additionally coached the Seleção from Brazil at the youth level.

Honorius

Player 
Vasco da Gama 
 Campeonato Carioca: 1988

Manager 
Cruzeiro
 Campeonato Mineiro: 2004, 2006

Itumbiara
 Campeonato Goiano: 2008

Atlético Goianiense
 Campeonato Goiano: 2011

Ceará
 Campeonato Cearense: 2012

References

Living people
Footballers from Rio de Janeiro (city)
1962 births
Brazilian footballers
Brazilian football managers
Brazilian expatriate football managers
Expatriate football managers in Qatar
Expatriate football managers in Portugal
Campeonato Brasileiro Série A players
Campeonato Brasileiro Série A managers
Campeonato Brasileiro Série B managers
Campeonato Brasileiro Série C managers
Primeira Liga managers
CR Vasco da Gama players
Botafogo de Futebol e Regatas players
Campo Grande Atlético Clube players
Associação Desportiva Cabofriense players
Americano Futebol Clube players
CR Vasco da Gama managers
Sociedade Esportiva Palmeiras managers
Cruzeiro Esporte Clube managers
CR Flamengo managers
Associação Desportiva Cabofriense managers
Botafogo de Futebol e Regatas managers
Associação Desportiva São Caetano managers
Fluminense FC managers
Clube Náutico Capibaribe managers
Itumbiara Esporte Clube managers
Figueirense FC managers
Esporte Clube Juventude managers
Atlético Clube Goianiense managers
Ceará Sporting Club managers
Sport Club do Recife managers
Esporte Clube Vitória managers
Al-Arabi SC (Qatar) managers
Clube Atlético Bragantino managers
Clube Atlético Penapolense managers
Joinville Esporte Clube managers
C.S. Marítimo managers
Madureira Esporte Clube managers
Associação Portuguesa de Desportos managers
Santa Cruz Futebol Clube managers
Association football goalkeepers